The Balcony is the debut studio album by Welsh indie rock band Catfish and the Bottlemen. It was released on 15 September 2014 in the United Kingdom and 15 January 2015 in the United States. On 20 March 2015, The Balcony was awarded a Gold certification from the British Phonographic Industry. The album cover depicts outlines of two headless people pleasuring each other's genitals. The illustration is by New York artist Tim Lahan who originally posted it to his Flickr account in 2009 and was subsequently contacted by the band.

The Balcony has been nominated for the Welsh Music Prize 2014–15. As the band's second album The Ride was releasing, it was reported that The Balcony had sold 250,000 copies. In the United States, the album has sold 37,000 copies as of April 2016.

Reception
Critical reception of the album was mixed, with review aggregator Metacritic giving it 52/100 based on 6 reviews. Writing for AllMusic, Scott Kerr gave it three and a half stars out of five, saying that McCann's "weathered and assured vocals" gave an impression of a more experienced band and that Billy Bibby provided "grand Johnny Marr-inspired guitar hooks that are unapologetically catchy, gritty, and full of swagger". Ben Homewood of NME was more critical, giving the album 4/10 for being "ham-fisted and about nine years too late" despite "unstoppable desire and conviction". Tillie Elvrum of XS Noize rated the album 7/10, calling it "an incredibly polished debut album."

Track listing
Words by Van McCann and music by Catfish and the Bottlemen

Trivia
An edited version of their song "Cocoon" was featured in the EA Sports game, FIFA 15, as a part of the game's soundtrack.
Ewan McGregor features in the music video for the single "Hourglass".

Personnel
Catfish and the Bottlemen
Van McCann – lead vocals, rhythm guitar, piano
Billy Bibby – lead guitar, backing vocals
Benji Blakeway – bass guitar, backing vocals
Bob Hall – drums, percussion

Additional musicians
Jim Abbiss – programming; additional piano (track 6)
Ben Lovett – additional piano (track 4)

Additional personnel
Ian Dowling – engineering, mixing

Charts

Weekly charts

Year-end charts

Certifications

References

2014 debut albums
Catfish and the Bottlemen albums
Island Records albums
Albums produced by Jim Abbiss